A Talk is the third extended play (EP) by South Korean singer Hyuna. It was released on July 28, 2014, by Cube Entertainment and distributed by Universal Music. The physical album was released a day later on July 29. The EP consists of five tracks and incorporates elements of Pop, R&B and Hip Hop. To promote the EP, Hyuna appeared on several South Korean music programs, including Music Bank, Show! Music Core and Inkigayo. "Red" was released as the title track for the EP.

Background and release
On June 26, 2014, Cube Entertainment announced that Hyuna would be releasing her third solo EP. A reality documentary program, Sexy Queen, was produced to show her preparation and promotional activities for the album release.  On July 15, the name of the TV show was changed from Sexy Queen to Hyuna's Free Month, and aired its first episode on July 21 on SBS MTV.

Hyuna performed the EP's lead single "Red" (빨개요; Ppalgaeyo) and the EP's B-side track "Blacklist" on music shows starting on July 25 on KBS's Music Bank, MBC's Show! Music Core, SBS's Inkigayo and Mnet's M! Countdown.

Reception
On August 6, 2014, Hyuna won her first ever music show award on MBC Music's Show Champion for "Red", and won on the same show again the following week.

Despite calling "Red" "fifty shades of messy," Lucas Villa of AXS praised Hyuna for delivering a "club banger that would make Miley proud." Rolling Stone named "Red" number 5 on their year-end list of the top ten music videos of 2014.

Commercial performance 
A Talk entered and peaked at number 3 on the Gaon Album Chart on the chart issue dated July 27 – August 2, 2014. A Talk charted at number 17 on the Gaon Album Chart for the month of July 2014 with 8,183 copies sold.

The title track "Red" entered and peaked at number 3 on the Gaon Digital Chart on the chart issue dated July 27 – August 2, 2014 with 221,261 downloads sold – topping the componing Download Chart – and 3,230,615 streams. In the same week, "Blacklist", the EP's B-side track also entered the Digital Chart at number 70.

Track listing

Charts

Albums chart

Sales and certifications

Awards and nominations

Music program awards

Release history

References

Hyuna albums
2014 EPs
Korean-language EPs
Dance-pop EPs
Cube Entertainment EPs